, also known as GYT, is a television network headquartered in Tochigi Prefecture, Japan.  It is a member of the Japanese Association of Independent Television Stations (JAITS). The government of Tochigi prefecture hold half stock share of GYT. 

Tochigi Television is the last analog terrestrial TV station in Japan, it was started broadcasting in April 1, 1999.  Tochigi TV started digital terrestrial television broadcasting in December 1, 2005.

References

External links
 Official website 

Television stations in Japan
Independent television stations in Japan
1999 establishments in Japan
Television channels and stations established in 1999